David Hamilton Grant (born Willis Andrew Holt; 1939–1991) was an English porn producer during the late 1960s and 1970s.

Biography
Willis Andrew Holt was born in Uxbridge in 1939. He changed his name by Deed Poll on the 22 January 1982 to David Hamilton Grant.

David Grant first film was Love Variations (1969) a sex education film that was based on a ‘marriage manual’ Grant had photographed/published a year earlier. Grant's sex film empire grew in the 1970s, he opened up a number of adult cinemas, the first being 'The Pigalle' in 1974, distributed foreign sex films through his "Oppidan" company, and produced his own featurette length British sex comedies (Girls Come First, The Office Party, Under the Bed) He also produced Snow White and the Seven Perverts (1973), a pornographic animated short parodying Snow White and the Seven Dwarfs.

Grant's featurettes were often released on the lower half of cinema double-bills with popular European sex films in order to capitalise on the Eady Levy tax situation. For example Girls Come First was paired on a 1975 double bill with Enter The 7 Virgins, the Grant produced The Over-Amorous Artist was retitled Just One More Time and re-released as the support feature to a 1975 release of Just Jaeckin’s Emmanuelle (1974), The Office Party was paired on a 1976 double bill with Linda Lovelace for President, and the Grant directed Sensations starring Cosey Fanni Tutti and Genesis P-Orridge was the support feature to Pussy Talk (1975).  Described in a 1978 profile in Punch magazine as “a chubby, boyish forty-year-old, with a youthful, uncorrupted face enfolded in two glossy skull-caps of hair and beard”, Grant liked to refer to himself as the ‘King of Sexploitation’, Grant enjoyed giving himself Hitchcock cameos in his own films.

During the making of The Office Party (1976), Grant got into a furious row with actor Johnny Briggs, after Briggs refused to bare all for the film. Briggs feared such exposure could damage his reputation, and a furious Grant threatened to fire him.  After the intervention of Briggs’ agent, a compromise was reached and Briggs performed the offending scene with his underpants on.  Briggs later recalled this story in his autobiography, noting that after the film he vowed never to work with Grant again.   As well as his sex films Grant also produced X-rated cartoons like Sinderella (1972), and comedy shorts like Escape to Entebbe''' (1976) a parody of Idi Amin featuring a browned up John Bluthal as a Pakistani TV reporter.

In the early eighties, Grant turned to video, forming the World of Video 2000 label with fellow 1970s sex film mogul Malcolm Fancey. Grant held the position of company secretary, while Fancey was head of marketing. The company launched onto the video market with several soft porn titles in December 1981. in 1983 Grant noted that Steven Spielberg’s film E.T. the Extra Terrestrial had yet to be released on home video in the UK, and responded by releasing an old sixties 'B' movie called Night Fright (1968) on video under the title E.T.N - The Extra Terrestrial Nastie, with video artwork that parodied the E.T poster. Universal International Pictures threatened legal action, and the tape was withdrawn then later re-released with different artwork.

On 3 February 1984, Grant was imprisoned for distributing ‘video nasty’ Nightmares in a Damaged Brain (1981) on video. Grant was sentenced to 6 months in prison for being in "possession of over 200 copies of an obscene article for publication for gain", he was found guilty under section two of the obscene publications act. Grant's defense lawyer during the trial was Geoffrey Robertson. After Grant's imprisonment, World of Video 2000 (and its parent company April Electronics) were placed into liquidation.

The Slough Observer alleged that Grant had been a drug dealer, and had “corrupted thousands of children” during his time in Northern Cyprus.

He died in 1991, believed to have been victim of a contract killing.

Filmography
 Love Variations (1969, director as ‘Terry Gould’)
 Sex, Love and Marriage (1970, director as ‘Terry Gould’)
 Sinderella (1972, co-producer, writer)
 Au Pair Girls (1972, story)
 Snow White and the Seven Perverts (1973, co-producer, writer)
 Secrets of a Door-to-Door Salesman (1973, producer)
 The Over-Amorous Artist a.k.a. Just One More Time (1974, producer)
 The Great McGonagall (1974, producer)
 Pink Orgasm (1975, uncompleted, footage later edited into ‘Who Bears Sins’ (1987))
 Girls Come First (1975, co-producer)
 Dear Marjorie Boobs (1976, producer)
 The Office Party (1976, director,producer, writer)
 Escape to Entebbe (1976 co-director,producer)
 Under the Bed (1977, director, co-producer)
 Submission (1977, director)
 Over Exposed (1977, footage later edited into ‘Who Bears Sins’ (1987))
 The Kiss (1977, co-producer)
 End of Term (1978, producer)
 Marcia (1977, script/co-director)
 You’re Driving Me Crazy (1978, director, co-writer)
 Love is Beautiful (1978, unfilmed)
 The London Programme (1979, TV, Interviewee)
 Electric Blue 001 (1980, video, includes Grant's Snow White and the Seven Perverts, no other Grant involvement)
 Who Bears Sins (1987, director, video compilation)

Films distributed by David Grant
 Easy Virtue (1972, rejected)
 Succubus (1973)
 The Apprentice (1973, rejected)
 Wet Dreams (1974 rejected)
 Confessions of a Sex Maniac (1974)
 A Man of Our Time (1974)
 The Last House on the Left (1974, rejected)
 The Growling Tiger (1974)
 Best of the New York Film Festival (1975, rejected) 
 Woman’s Best Friend (1975, rejected)
 Ilsa, She Wolf of the SS (1975, rejected)
 Take an Easy Ride (1975)
 Far Gone- Too Far Gone (1975)
 Crimson Acceleration (1975)
 Submission a.k.a. Pets (1975)
 The Bruce Lee Story (1975)
 The No Mercy Man (1975)
 My X Wife (1976, rejected)
 The Coming of Seymour (1976, rejected)
 The Best Way to Walk (1976)
 Late Night Trains (1976, rejected)
 The Younger the Better (1976)
 Divine Obsession (1976)
 Only in Denmark (1976)
 Cathy's Curse (1977)
 What a Performer (1977)
 Dreams of Thirteen (1977)
 Depraved (1976)
 Exhibition (1976, rejected)
 Linda Lovelace for President (1976)
 Sensations (1977)
 Draws (1977)
 Through the Looking Glass (1977)
 Private Collection (1977)
 Good Taste (1977)
 Desperate Living (1977, rejected)
 Pelvis a.k.a. Hard Up(1977)
 Pussy Talk (1977)
 His Model Wife (1978, rejected)
 The Young Tycoon (1978)
 Memories within Miss Aggie (1978)
 Dark Star (1978)
 Days in London (1978)
 Soft Places (1978)
 Shock Waves (1978)
 Lebanon Why? (1978)
 Take Off (1979)
 Feel My Love (1979)
 Big Ones (1979)
 Video Blue a.k.a. The Double Exposure of Holly (1980)
 Nightmares in a Damaged Brain'' (1982)

Titles marked ‘rejected’ were refused classification by the British censor and therefore banned. Dates refer to the year of distribution, rather than the films actual production dates.

References

 Johnny Briggs and Pat Codd “Johnny Briggs: My Autobiography” 1998 (Blake Publishing)

External links
 

British pornographic film producers
British animated film producers
British parodists
Parody film directors
People from Uxbridge
1939 births
1991 deaths
Date of birth missing
People convicted of obscenity
People murdered in the United Kingdom
20th-century British businesspeople